Eastfield is a town and civil parish in North Yorkshire, England. It was often considered a suburb of the town of Scarborough, and is located next to the town's boundaries. It was granted town status in January 2016.

According to the 2011 UK census, Eastfield parish had a population of 5,610, a reduction on the 2001 UK census figure of 5,863.
The town council is Eastfield Town Council.

The area has a mid-size Industrial Park (Olympian Trading Park), the rapidly expanding Scarborough Business Park, and Plaxton Park is on the outskirts of Eastfield. The area is the base for a number of large businesses, for example Plaxton, Raflatac, Unison, Cooplands and Dale Power Solutions. The largest factory in the vicinity is McCain Foods.  Boyes, a discount department store chain which has over 60 stores across the north has its head office and warehouse facilities here.

Eastfield was home to local commercial radio station Yorkshire Coast Radio which broadcast to Scarborough, Filey, Bridlington and Whitby on FM and DAB, until its closure.

George Pindar, is the local secondary school for Eastfield, and the surrounding vicinity.

In April 2021, Historic England announced the discovery of an important Roman residential site during a survey for a new housing estate, suggesting it to be either a religious sanctuary, a luxury villa or combination of both. It is a type of building layout not known of elsewhere in Britain. Within hours of the announcement of the discovery, people trespassed onto the site and caused damage to the building. The discovery of the site caused a reduction of planned homes, from approximately 150 to 94.

References

External links

Eastfield Town Council website

 
Towns in North Yorkshire
Civil parishes in North Yorkshire
Scarborough, North Yorkshire